The 2017 Denmark Super Series Premier is the ninth Super Series tournament of the 2017 BWF Super Series. The tournament took place at Odense Sports Park in Odense, Denmark from October 17 – 22, 2017 and had a total prize of $750,000.

Men's singles

Seeds

Top half

Bottom half

Finals

Women's singles

Seeds

Top half

Bottom half

Finals

Men's doubles

Seeds

Top half

Bottom half

Finals

Women's doubles

Seeds

Top half

Bottom half

Finals

Mixed doubles

Seeds

Top half

Bottom half

Finals

References

External links
 Tournament Link

Denmark Open
Denmark
2017 in Danish sport
Sport in Odense
Denmark Super Series Premier